The 2008 Tim Hortons Brier, Canada's men's curling championship, was held from March 8 to 16 at the MTS Centre in Winnipeg, Manitoba. Skipped by Kevin Martin, Alberta defeated the defending champion, and reigning World Champion Glenn Howard and Team Ontario. The final pitted arguably the top 2 teams in the world, at least the top 2 teams in the World Curling Tour. The final, while close, failed to live up to expectations, and was widely considered boring, and was full of mistakes due to ice problems. Martin had a draw to the button in the tenth end to win the game.

Teams

Round-robin standings
Final round-robin standings

Round-robin results
All draw times are listed in Central Standard Time (UTC−6).

Draw 1
Saturday, March 8, 14:00

Draw 2
Saturday, March 8, 19:00

Draw 3
Sunday, March 9, 8:30

Draw 4
Sunday, March 9, 14:00

Draw 5
Sunday, March 9, 19:00

Draw 6
Monday, March 10, 9:30

Draw 7
Monday, March 10, 14:00

Draw 8
Monday, March 10, 19:00

Draw 9
Tuesday, March 11, 9:30

Draw 10
Tuesday, March 11, 14:00

Draw 11
Tuesday, March 11, 19:00

Draw 12
Wednesday, March 12, 9:30

Draw 13
Wednesday, March 12, 14:00

Draw 14
Wednesday, March 12, 19:00

Draw 15
Thursday, March 13, 9:30

Draw 16
Thursday, March 13, 14:00

Draw 17
Thursday, March 13, 19:00

The Quebec vs. Northern Ontario match was the most recent Brier match that went to a second extra end.

Tiebreaker
Friday, March 14, 19:30

Playoffs

3 vs. 4
Friday, March 14, 15:00

1 vs. 2
Friday, March 14, 20:00

Semifinal
Saturday, March 15, 13:30

Final
Sunday, March 16, 17:30

Statistics

Top 5 player percentages
Round Robin only

Playdowns

Defending provincial champions in italics

Alberta
The 2008 Boston Pizza Cup February 12–17, Grant Fuhr Arena, Spruce Grove

Triple knock out format.

Playoffs
1 vs. 2: Martin 7-6 Ferbey
3 vs. 4: Pahl 3-6 Koe
Semifinal: Ferbey 11-7 Koe
Final: Martin 7-4 Ferbey

British Columbia
February 4–10, Penticton Curling Club, Penticton

Tie-breakers
Joanisse 10-5 McArdle
Horning 11-6 Joanisse

Page Playoffs
Buchy 2-8 Ursel
McAulay 8-1 Horning

Semifinal
McAulay 7-3 Buchy

Final
McAulay 7-8 Ursel

Manitoba
February 13–17, Brandon Keystone Centre, Brandon

Double knock out format with a playoff round and then a page playoff championship. After Saturday afternoon draws.

Playoffs
1 vs. 2: Burtnyk 5-8 Bohn
3 vs. 4: Peters 3-5 McEwen
Semifinal: McEwen 5-7 Burtnyk
Final: Bohn 5-11 Burtnyk

New Brunswick
February 13–17, Capital Winter Club, Fredericton 

Tie breakers
Sherrard 9-1 Brannen
Sullivan 7-3 Howard
Sullivan 7-6 Sherrard

Semifinal
Sullivan 5-6 Mallais

Final
Mallais 2-9 Grattan

Defending champion Paul Dobson did not qualify/participate

Newfoundland and Labrador
February 5–10, Carol Curling Club, Labrador City

Tiebreaker
Noseworthy 10-11 Smith

Semifinal
Gushue 8-4 Smith

Final
Ryan 3-7 Gushue

Northern Ontario
February 4–9, Englehart & Area Community Complex, Englehart

Group A

Group B

Tie breakers
Dumontelle 6-4 Henderson
Dumontelle 5-3 Adams

Playoffs
A2 vs. B3: E. Harnden 9-5 Lapointe
B2 vs. A3: Dumontelle 8-7 Gordon
B1 vs. A1: Currie 7-3 Clifford
Quarter final: E. Harnden 11-10 Dumontelle
Semifinal: E. Harnden 7-3 Clifford
Final: Currie 3-7 E. Harnden

Nova Scotia
February 6–10, Wolfville Curling Club, Wolfville  Triple knock-out format.

Playoffs
1 vs. 2: Saunders 3-4 Rafuse
3 vs. 4: MacKenzie 5-10 Adams
Semifinal: Saunders 6-7 Adams
Final: Rafuse 4-3 Adams

Ontario
The 2008 TSC Stores Tankard, February 4–10, Waterloo Memorial Recreation Complex, Waterloo

Tie breakers
Tuck 9-4 Middaugh
Lobel 9-8 Tuck

Page Playoffs
Howard 4-6 Corner
Lobel 7-8 Harris

Semifinal
Harris 2-7 Howard

Final
Corner 4-9 Howard

Prince Edward Island
February 5–10, Crapaud Community Curling Club, Crapaud

Tiebreaker
Stevenson 9-6 Shaw

Playoffs
1 vs. 2: Likely 5-6 Gallant
3 vs. 4: Stevenson 10-3 MacDonald
Semifinal: Likely 10-5 Stevenson
Final: Likely 7-8 Gallant

Quebec
February 5–12, Colisée de Trois-Rivières, Trois-Rivières

Group A

Group B

Defending champion Pierre Charette is playing third for Hemmings.

Tie breakers
Tardif 10-4 Reid
Roberge 7-3 Dupuis
Roberge 10-2 Tardif

Playoffs
A2 vs. B3: Desjardins 5-4 Butler
B2 vs. A3: Roberge 9-4 Bédard
A1 vs. B1: Ménard 7-5 Ferland
Quarter-final: Roberge 7-4 Desjardins
Semi-final: Ferland 7-5 Roberge
Final: Ménard 7-5 Ferland

Saskatchewan
February 6–10, Balgonie Arena, Balgonie.  Triple elimination until playoff round.

Playoffs
1 vs. 2: Bryden 4-6 Simmons
3 vs. 4: Jordison 4-10 McKee
Semifinal: Bryden 4-6 McKee
Final: Simmons 10-5 McKee

Yukon/Northwest Territories
February 14–17, Whitehorse Curling Club, Whitehorse.  Double round robin. Through five draws.

Tiebreakers
Solberg d. Moss
Cowan 9-8 Solberg

Defending champion Jamie Koe was eliminated in the N.W.T. playdowns.

References

See also
 2008 World Men's Curling Championship
 2008 World Junior Curling Championships
 2008 World Mixed Doubles Curling Championship
 2008 Ford World Women's Curling Championship
 2008 Scotties Tournament of Hearts

Tim Hortons Brier, 2008
The Brier
Curling competitions in Winnipeg
2008 in Manitoba
March 2008 sports events in Canada